Papua New Guinea first participated at the Olympic Games in 1976, and has sent athletes to compete in every Summer Olympic Games since then, except when the nation participated in the American-led boycott of the 1980 Summer Olympics. The nation has never won a medal and has never participated in the Winter Olympic Games.

Swimmer Ryan Pini is the country's most successful athlete to date, having reached the final of the men's 100 metre butterfly event at the 2008 Summer Olympics.

The National Olympic Committee for Papua New Guinea was created in 1973 and recognized by the International Olympic Committee in 1974.

Medal tables

Medals by Summer Games

See also
 List of flag bearers for Papua New Guinea at the Olympics
 :Category:Olympic competitors for Papua New Guinea
 Papua New Guinea at the Paralympics

References

External links
 
 
 

 
Olympics